Gyula Rumbold (6 December 1887 – 5 October 1959) was a Hungarian amateur association football player who competed in the 1912 Summer Olympics. He was a member of the Hungarian Olympic squad and played one match in the main tournament as well as two matches in the consolation tournament. He also won seven Hungarian titles with Ferencvárosi TC, and was capped a total of 33 times with the Hungarian national team.

References

External links
 

1887 births
1959 deaths
Hungarian footballers
Ferencvárosi TC footballers
Hungary international footballers
Olympic footballers of Hungary
Footballers at the 1912 Summer Olympics
Association football defenders
Footballers from Budapest